Kristian Nergaard (born 1 April 1962) is a Norwegian sailor who has 11 World championships in sailing all in the 5.5 metre class.

References

External links
 

1962 births
Living people
Norwegian male sailors (sport)
Sportspeople from Bergen
World Champions in 5.5 Metre
World champions in sailing for Norway